Taiwan, officially the Republic of China (ROC), competes as "Chinese Taipei" (TPE) at the Olympic Games  since 1984. Athletes compete under the Chinese Taipei Olympic flag instead of the flag of the Republic of China; for any medal ceremony, the National Flag Anthem of the Republic of China is played instead of the National Anthem of the Republic of China.

Taiwanese athletes won their first Olympic medal in 1960, and their first gold medal in 2004, and their highest total medal count in 2020 games.

Participation

Timeline of participation

Medals

Medals by Summer Games

Medals by Winter Games

Medals by Summer Sport

List of medalists

Timeline concerning Olympic recognition
The following timeline concerns the different names and principal events concerning recognition of the Republic of China (ROC) Olympic team:
1922 – The China National Amateur Athletic Federation is recognised by the International Olympic Committee (IOC) as the National Olympic Committee in China.
1932 – ROC competes in the Olympics for the first time as China.
1949 – The China National Amateur Athletic Federation moves to Taiwan.
1952 – ROC team withdraws from the Helsinki Olympics because the IOC permits the People's Republic of China (PRC) to participate.
1954 – IOC adopts a resolution officially recognising the PRC's Chinese Olympic Committee. 
1956 – ROC represents at Melbourne Games as the Republic of China. PRC withdraws from the Games in protest because two Chinese Olympic Committees are in the list of IOC members.
1958 – PRC withdraws from Olympic movement and all federations governing Olympic sports. Professor Dong Shouyi, an IOC member for the PRC resigns.
1959 – IOC informs the ROC that they do not control sport on Mainland China, rules determine the ROC will no longer be recognised under the "Chinese Olympic Committee" title. All applications under a different name would be considered.
1960 – ROC committee is renamed the "Olympic Committee of the Republic of China", and so recognised.
1963 – IOC recognizes the name "Taiwan", and the NOC is allowed to use the initials "ROC" on sports outfits.
1968 – IOC agrees to renaming the Taiwan team as the Republic of China after the 1968 Games and to its participation under that banner.
1976 – ROC is not permitted to participate in the Montreal Summer Games, as long as it insists on the name of Republic of China, because the host country, Canada, recognises the PRC as the sole legitimate government of China.
1979 – IOC recognises the Chinese Olympic Committee as the official representative of China. The IOC decision is followed by a postal ballot among 89 members. Under the IOC decision, the ROC's Olympics committee would renamed as "Chinese Taipei Olympic Committee" and is not allowed to use the ROC's national anthem or flag.
1980 – ROC boycotts the Lake Placid Winter Games and the Moscow Summer Games due to the decision to use the name Chinese Taipei in international sporting events.
1981 – An agreement is signed in Lausanne by Juan Antonio Samaranch, the president of the IOC, and Shen Chia-ming, the president of the Chinese Taipei Olympic Committee (CTOC). The agreement specifies the name, flag and emblem of the CTOC.
1984 – Chinese Taipei competes for the first time under the new moniker at the Sarajevo Winter Games.

See also
 List of flag bearers for Chinese Taipei at the Olympics
 :Category:Olympic competitors for Taiwan
 Chinese Taipei Olympic Committee
 Chinese Taipei Olympic flag
 Chinese Taipei at the Asian Games
 Republic of China at the Olympics
 Chinese Taipei at the Paralympics

References

External links